Huilacunca (possibly from Aymara wila blood, blood-red, kunka throat, "red throat") is a mountain in the Vilcanota mountain range in the Andes of Peru, about  high. It is situated in the Puno Region, Carabaya Province, Corani District. Huilacunca lies northeast of the mountains Jatuncucho and Jonorana.

References 

Mountains of Puno Region
Mountains of Peru